The Ludwig Prandtl Ring is the highest award of the Deutsche Gesellschaft für Luft- und Raumfahrt (German Society for Aeronautics and Astronautics), awarded "for outstanding contribution in the field of aerospace engineering". The award is named in honour of Ludwig Prandtl.

Recipients 

 1957 Theodore von Kármán
 1958 Albert Betz
 1959 Claudius Dornier
 1960 Frederick Handley Page
 1961 Henrich Focke
 1962 
 1963 
 1964 
 1965 Jakob Ackeret
 1966 Adolf Busemann
 1967 Giuseppe Gabrielli
 1968 Hans W. Liepmann
 1969 Hermann Schlichting
 1970 Dietrich Küchemann
 1971 Robert Legendre
 1972 Ludwig Bölkow
 1973 
 1974 William R. Sears
 1975 August W. Quick
 1976 Alec David Young
 1977 
 1978 Robert Thomas Jones
 1979 Fritz Schultz-Grunow
 1980 Herbert A. Wagner
 1981 
 1982 Kurt Magnus
 1983 James Lighthill
 1984 Bernhard H. Goethert
 1985 
 1986 Roger Béteille
 1987 Holt Ashley
 1988 
 1989 
 1990 Hubert Ludwieg
 1991 
 1992 Hans von Ohain
 1993 
 1994 Josef Singer
 1995 
 1996 Harvard Lomax
 1997 
 1998 Jürgen Zierep
 1999 Hans G. Hornung
 2000 Julius C. Rotta
 2001 Not awarded
 2002 Boris Laschka
 2003 
 2004 Egon Krause
 2005 Wilhelm Schneider
 2006 
 2007 Peter Hamel
 2008 Yuri Kachanov
 2009 Siegfried Wagner
 2010 Michael Gaster
 2011 Not awarded
 2012 John W. Hutchinson
 2013 
 2014 Dietrich Hummel
 2015 
 2016 Egbert Torenbeek
 2017 Helmut Sobieczky
 2018 Hermann Fasel
 2019 Ann Dowling

See also

 List of aviation awards
 List of engineering awards

References

External links 
 DGLR: Recipients

Academic awards
Aviation awards
Awards established in 1957
Engineering awards
German science and technology awards